Sok Chang-suk (born 1 February 1963) is a North Korean archer.

Olympics

She competed in the women's individual event at the 1980 Summer Olympic Games and finished seventeenth with a score of 2269 points.

References

External links 
 Profile on worldarchery.org

1963 births
North Korean female archers
Olympic archers of North Korea
Archers at the 1980 Summer Olympics
Living people